Kolev is a common Bulgarian surname derived from the name of Nikolaj, Kolja. It is the surname of sons and daughters (for women: Koleva) of a father who is named Nikolaj. Notable people with the name Kolev include:
 Aleksandar Kolev (born 1992), Bulgarian football forward
 Angel Kolev (born 1926), Bulgarian Olympic sprinter
 Atanas Kolev (born 1967), Bulgarian chess player
 Atanas Kolev (rapper) (born 1996), Bulgarian rapper and basketball player
 Binko Kolev (born 1958), Bulgarian Olympic runner
 Bozhil Kolev (born 1949), Bulgarian football player and manager
 Deyan Kolev (1965–2013), Bulgarian Olympic gymnast
Diana Koleva (born 1959), Bulgarian Olympic badminton player
Dilyan Kolev (born 1988), Bulgarian football player
 Dimitar Kolev, later Dumitru Coliu
 Elena Koleva (born 1977), Bulgarian volleyball player
Elizabeth Koleva (born 1972), Bulgarian rhythmic gymnast
Hristo Kolev (born 1964), Bulgarian football midfielder
 Ivan Kolev (disambiguation)
 Ivanka Koleva (born 1968), Bulgarian field athlete
 Krasimir Kolev (born 1971), Bulgarian football goalkeeper
Maria Koleva (born 1940), Bulgarian writer 
Maria Koleva (gymnast) (born 1977), Bulgarian rhythmic gymnast
 Nikolay Kolev (disambiguation)
 Nedelcho Kolev (born 1953), Bulgarian weightlifter
Pavel Kolev (born 1975), Bulgarian football defender
 Petar Kolev (disambiguation)
Petrana Koleva (born 1947), Bulgarian sprint canoer 
 Plamen Kolev (born 1988), Bulgarian football goalkeeper 
 Rosen Kolev (born 1990), Bulgarian football defender
Slavina Koleva (born 1986), Bulgarian volleyball player
Stancho Kolev (born 1937), Bulgarian freestyle wrestler
Stefan Kolev (born 1966), Bulgarian football manager and former football defender
Stefka Koleva (born 1954), Bulgarian Olympic rower
Svetla Zlateva-Koleva (born 1952), Bulgarian runner
 Stoyan Kolev (born 1976), Bulgarian football goalkeeper
Stoyko Kolev (born 1986), Bulgarian football player
 Tanya Stefanova-Koleva (born 1972), Bulgarian pole vaulter
 Todor Kolev (disambiguation)
 Victoria Koleva (born 1960), Bulgarian actress
 Vladimir Kolev (born 1953), Bulgarian boxer
Yoan Kolev (born 1991), Bulgarian windsurfer
 Zornitza Koleva (born 1979), Spanish handball player

Bulgarian-language surnames